The 2001 Insurrextion was the second annual Insurrextion professional wrestling pay-per-view event produced by the American promotion, World Wrestling Federation (WWF, now WWE). It took place on May 5, 2001, at the Earls Court Exhibition Centre in London, England and was broadcast exclusively in the United Kingdom. It was the final Insurrextion produced before the promotion introduced the brand extension in March 2002.

Production

Background
In 2000, the American professional wrestling promotion World Wrestling Federation (WWF, now WWE) held a United Kingdom-exclusive pay-per-view (PPV) titled Insurrextion. The following year, a second Insurrextion PPV was announced to be held on May 5, 2001, at the Earls Court Exhibition Centre in London, England, the same venue as the first event, thus establishing Insurrextion as an annual UK PPV for the promotion.

Storylines
The event featured seven professional wrestling matches and two pre-show matches that involved different wrestlers from pre-existing scripted feuds and storylines. Wrestlers portrayed villains, heroes, or less distinguishable characters in the scripted events that built tension and culminated in a wrestling match or series of matches.

Aftermath
The 2001 Insurrextion was the final Insurrextion produced before the promotion introduced the brand extension in March 2002, which divided the roster into two separate brands, Raw and SmackDown!, where wrestlers were exclusively assigned to perform. The following year's event was subsequently a Raw-exclusive show.

Results

(*) Since Undertaker pinned Triple H, he did not win the title

Other on-screen talent

See also

Professional wrestling in the United Kingdom

References

2001 WWF pay-per-view events
2001 in England
Events in London
Professional wrestling in England
WWE Insurrextion
May 2001 events in the United Kingdom